The following is a list of Grammy Awards winners and nominees from Cuba:

Notes

References

Cuban
 Grammy
Grammy